Carole Merle (born 24 January 1964) is a former French Alpine skier. A specialist of Giant Slalom and Super-G, she won 22 World Cup races, 6 World Cup season titles and 1 World Championship gold medal.

Skiing career
She took part in her first competition as a six-year-old, and made her World Cup debut at 18. On 23 January 1983, she took her first World Cup podium with a third-place finish in Giant Slalom at St. Gervais. But it took another few years for her to reach her full potential.

Her first World Cup win came on 6 January 1988 at Tignes. The following season saw her bag the World cup title in Super-G, finishing 4 points ahead of 1988 Olympic champion Sigrid Wolf. Merle went on to win the Super-G season title 4 years in a row (1989–1992), a feat only equalled in later years by Katja Seizinger of Germany (1993–1996) and Lindsey Vonn of the USA (2009–2012). In addition, Merle won the Giant Slalom World Cup in 1992 and 1993. These two same years, she finished 2nd (behind Austria's Petra Kronberger) and 3rd in the World Cup overall standings.

At the 1989 World Championships in Vail she won a silver medal in the Giant Slalom, two years later at the 1991 World Championships in Saalbach she won another medal and at the 1993 World Championships in Morioka she finally won the gold medal in the Giant Slalom. At the 1992 Olympics in Albertville she won a silver medal in the Super-G event.

Later life 
Merle retired at the end of the 1994 ski season. During her career, she had earnings of more than 20 million French francs, which an uncle was managing on her behalf. In 1997, she made headlines when she publicly announced she had lost everything and had accumulated more than 70 million in debts, accusing her uncle of mismanaging her fortune.

She later settled away from the ski slopes, in a Camargue farmhouse, to pursue her passion for horses. In a 2012 interview for French newspaper Le Dauphiné libéré, she claimed she had not skied for at least six years, but added she would never miss a ski World Cup on TV.

World Cup results

Season standings
 6 titles – (4 SG, 2 GS)

Race victories 
22 wins – (12 SG, 10 GS)
44 podiums, 88 top tens

See also
List of FIS Alpine Ski World Cup women's race winners

References

External links
 
 

1964 births
Living people
Sportspeople from Alpes-de-Haute-Provence
French female alpine skiers
Olympic alpine skiers of France
Olympic silver medalists for France
Merle, Carole
Merle, Carole
Merle, Carole
Merle, Carole
Olympic medalists in alpine skiing
FIS Alpine Ski World Cup champions
Medalists at the 1992 Winter Olympics